Rana rupta et bos (The Frog that exploded, and the ox) is a Latin retelling from the Liber primus of the Fabulae (1:24) of the Roman poet Phaedrus (1st century); the Latin text is itself based on The Frog and the Ox, one of Aesop's Fables.

The Fable

References

External links 
 Der Frosch und der Ochse (“The Frog and the Ox”), p. 90, illustrated Latin manuscript, at uni-mannheim.de

Fables
Cattle in art
Latin-language literature
1st-century literature